Long Prairie Municipal Airport , also known as Todd Field or Todd Field Airport, is a public use airport located four nautical miles (7 km) south of the central business district of Long Prairie, a city in Todd County, Minnesota, United States. The airport is owned by Todd County and the City of Long Prairie.

Facilities and aircraft 
It has one runway designated 16/34 with an asphalt surface measuring 3,000 by 75 feet (914 x 23 m).

For the 12-month period ending July 21, 2008, the airport had 5,730 aircraft operations, an average of 15 per day: 99.8% general aviation and 0.2% military. At that time there were 15 aircraft based at this airport: 93% single-engine and 7% ultralight.

References

External links 
 Aerial photo as of 28 April 1991 from USGS The National Map
 
 

Airports in Minnesota
Transportation in Todd County, Minnesota
Buildings and structures in Todd County, Minnesota